The World Allround Speed Skating Championships for Men took place on 9 and 10 February 1974 in Inzell at the Ludwig Schwabl Stadion ice rink.

Classification

 *= Fell
 
Source:

Attribution
In Dutch

References 

World Allround Speed Skating Championships, 1974
1974 World Allround